Dhanapura  is a village in the southern state of Karnataka, India. It is located in the Hospet taluk of Bellary district in Karnataka.

Demographics
 India census, Danapuram is a large village located in Hospet Taluka of Bellary district, Karnataka with total 1530 families residing. The Danapuram village has population of 7256 of which 3741 are males while 3515 are females as per Population Census 2011.

See also
 Bellary
 Districts of Karnataka

References

External links
 http://Bellary.nic.in/

Villages in Bellary district